Des Kennedy (born July 1955) was an Irish footballer. During his career he played for League of Ireland sides Limerick, Galway United and Newcastlewest.

Kennedy is most notable for the two goals that he scored against European football powerhouse Real Madrid during the 1980–81 European Cup while playing for Limerick.
 Real Madrid conceded only four goals in their European Cup campaign which resulted in defeat to Liverpool in the final.

He signed for Limerick from Janesboro United and also had a brief contract in the mid-1970s with Galway United. He ended his League of Ireland career with NewcastleWest F.C.

At the end of the 2012 League of Ireland season, Kennedy became joint-ranked twenty seventh in the all-time League of Ireland goal-scoring list with 117 league goals

Honours
League of Ireland
 Limerick F.C. 1979/80
FAI Cup
 Limerick F.C. 1982
League of Ireland Cup
 Limerick F.C. 1975-76

References

External links
Des Kennedy in 'Soccer Players' file at Limerick City Library, Ireland

Republic of Ireland association footballers
Sportspeople from Limerick (city)
Association footballers from County Limerick
League of Ireland players
League of Ireland XI players
Limerick F.C. players
Galway United F.C. (1937–2011) players
Living people
1955 births
Association football forwards